Częstochowa University of Technology is the largest and oldest institution of higher education in Częstochowa, Poland. All faculties of the university have the right to grant doctoral degrees (currently over 300 post-graduate students), and three of them also offer PhD habilitation.

General information
The university was first founded in 1949 as the School of Engineering. In 1955 the name was changed to current . The university employs over 1,400 staff, including 840 academic teachers, out of whom 165 are independent scientific researchers. There are around 12,000 students, studying 90 courses within 19 fields of study, full-time and part-time.

For over 9 years the university is home to an academic choir Collegium Cantorum and an Academic Sports Association with 13 different sports divisions.

Faculties

Currently there are 6 faculties:
 Faculty of Mechanical Engineering and Computer Science
 Faculty of Processing and Material Engineering and Applied Physics
 Faculty of Civil Engineering
 Faculty of Electrical Engineering
 Faculty of Environmental Engineering
 Faculty of Management

Rectors
Jerzy Kołakowski (1949–59)
Wacław Sakwa (1959–65)
Jan Grajcar (1965–70)
Kazimierz Moszoro (1970–74)
Józef Ledwoń (1974–81)
Janusz Braszczyński (1981–82)
Józef Ledwoń (1982–84)
Janusz Elsner (1984–90)
Janusz Braszczyński (1990–96)
Janusz Szopa (1996–2002)
Henryk Dyja (2002–2005)
January Bień (2005–2008)
Maria Nowicka-Skowron (2008–2016)
Norbert Sczygiol (2016–present)

Doctors honoris causa
Jan Węglarz, Polish computer scientist
Olgierd Zienkiewicz,  British mathematician and civil engineer of Polish descent
Tomasz Winnicki, Polish chemist

References

External links
 Official website in Polish and English

Engineering universities and colleges in Poland
Culture in Częstochowa